HSwMS Mode was a torpedo boat destroyer of the Royal Swedish Navy. Mode was built by the British shipbuilder Yarrow, launching in 1902, and was the first destroyer built for Sweden. She was employed on escort duties during the First World War and was sunk as a target in 1936.

Design
From 1899, the Swedish Navy Board began negotiations with British shipyards, including Yarrow, Thornycroft and Beardmores for its first destroyer, which was planned to become a template for Swedish production. Shortages of funds prevented an order being placed in 1900, but in August 1901, Sweden accepted an offer from Yarrow to build a single destroyer, with Yarrow quoting a price of £48000 compared to £52250 from Thornycroft. A contract to build the destroyer, to be called Mode, was signed on 4 October 1901, specifying a price of £48300.

Displacement was  normal, and  full load. The ship had an arched turtleback forecastle and four funnels. Armament consisted of six 57-mm QF guns, with two 450 mm (18-inch) torpedo tubes mounted aft. The ship had a crew of 62, comprising 4 officers, 13 non-commissioned officers and 45 ratings.

Service
Mode was built by Yarrow at their Poplar, London yard, as yard number 1118, and was launched on 22 July 1902. For the trials, a specially trained team of engineers and stokers were provided by Yarrow, while fuel was high grade coal and some oil. No armament was fitted, but the ship carried the equivalent weight in ballast. After acceptance and delivery to Karlskrona, Modes armament was fitted. When the trials were then repeated by the Swedes, the ship could only reach , although this still made her the fastest ship in the Swedish Navy by a considerable margin. The Yarrow hull design proved to be poorly suited to sea conditions in the Baltic Sea, and Mode was very wet forward. The design of Magne was chosen as the basis for production in Sweden, with four destroyers ( and the ) built between 1907 and 1909 based on this design.

In June 1905, Mode was deployed with Magne to the West coast of Sweden during the crisis that preceded the dissolution of the Union between Sweden and Norway. During the First World War, Mode was employed escorting convoys of merchant ships from ports in the Northeast of Sweden to Øresund and the Kattegat. She remained in commission until 1919, was stricken in 1928 and sunk as a target in 1936.

Notes

References

Bibliography
 
 
 

Destroyers of the Swedish Navy
Ships built in Poplar
1902 ships